The 27th Golden Horse Awards (Mandarin:第27屆金馬獎) took place on 10 December 1990 at National Theater in Taipei, Taiwan.

References

27th
1990 film awards
1990 in Taiwan